Walincourt is a former commune in the Nord department in northern France, merged in October 1972  with Selvigny to create Walincourt-Selvigny

Heraldry

See also
Communes of the Nord department

Former communes of Nord (French department)